Nataliya Leonidivna Tymoshkina (née Sherstyuk, born 25 May 1952) is a retired Ukrainian handball goalkeeper. She was part of the Soviet teams that won gold medals at the 1976 and 1980 Olympics and placed second at the 1975 and 1978 world championships. The Soviet team leaders Zinaida Turchyna and Tetyana Kocherhina credit the 1976 Olympic victory to Tymoshkina.

Tymoshkina started as a field player, and was converted into a goalkeeper by the coach. While she understood that she was more efficient in the goal she never liked that position.

References

1952 births
Living people
Soviet female handball players
Ukrainian female handball players
Handball players at the 1976 Summer Olympics
Handball players at the 1980 Summer Olympics
Olympic handball players of the Soviet Union
Olympic gold medalists for the Soviet Union
Olympic medalists in handball
Medalists at the 1980 Summer Olympics
Medalists at the 1976 Summer Olympics